Allison Township is a township in Brown County, South Dakota, United States.

Townships in Brown County, South Dakota
Townships in South Dakota